Hytanis is a genus of spiders in the family Oonopidae. It was first described in 1893 by Simon. , it contains only one species, Hytanis oblonga, found in Venezuela.

References

Oonopidae
Monotypic Araneomorphae genera
Spiders of South America